Miltiades Manno (19 February 1879 – 16 February 1935) was a Greek-born Hungarian rower and artist. Manno was born in Pancsova, Austria-Hungary and died in Budapest.

In 1912 Manno was a member of the Hungarian boat which was eliminated in the first round of the men's eight event.

At the 1932 Olympic Games Manno won a silver medal in the art competitions of the Olympics for his "Wrestling".

References

Sources

External links 
 

1879 births
1935 deaths
Olympic rowers of Hungary
Rowers at the 1912 Summer Olympics
Hungarian sculptors
Sportspeople from Pančevo
20th-century sculptors
Medalists at the 1932 Summer Olympics
Olympic silver medalists in art competitions
Hungarian male rowers
Hungarian male speed skaters
Olympic competitors in art competitions
Sportspeople from the Austro-Hungarian Empire